Flash Gordon is a pinball machine produced by Bally. It was the first split-level pinball machine from Bally, as well as the first game to use the "Squawk and Talk" sound board. It was also the second production Bally game with speech (Bally's 1980 Xenon was the first, utilizing a crude 'vocalizer' board set). The game is based on the perennially popular "Flash Gordon" character and stories of comics, film and television. The pinball machine was specifically produced to coincide and promote the 1980 film Flash Gordon.

External links
 
 How the Flippers work?
 How the Solenoid Driver work?

Pinball machines based on comics
Pinball machines based on films
Pinball machines based on television series
Bally pinball machines
Flash Gordon
1980 pinball machines